Polycylindricus is an extinct genus of bryozoans of the order Trepostomata with colonies forming cylindrical branches. In addition to branching created where main branches bifurcate, colonies also have smaller secondary branches perpendicular to the main branches.

References

Trepostomata
Animals described in 1960
Prehistoric bryozoan genera